The following lists events that happened during 1979 in Australia.

Incumbents

Monarch – Elizabeth II
Governor-General – Sir Zelman Cowen
Prime Minister – Malcolm Fraser
Deputy Prime Minister – Doug Anthony
Opposition Leader – Bill Hayden
Chief Justice – Sir Garfield Barwick

State and Territory Leaders
Premier of New South Wales – Neville Wran
Opposition Leader – John Mason
Premier of Queensland – Joh Bjelke-Petersen
Opposition Leader – Ed Casey
Premier of South Australia – Don Dunstan (until 15 February), then Des Corcoran (until 18 September), then David Tonkin
Opposition Leader – David Tonkin (until 18 September), then Des Corcoran (until 2 October), then John Bannon
Premier of Tasmania – Doug Lowe
Opposition Leader – Max Bingham (until 7 August), then Geoff Pearsall
Premier of Victoria – Rupert Hamer
Opposition Leader – Frank Wilkes
Premier of Western Australia – Sir Charles Court
Opposition Leader – Ron Davies
Chief Minister of the Northern Territory – Paul Everingham
Opposition Leader – Jon Isaacs
Chief Minister of Norfolk Island – David Buffett (from 10 August)

Governors and Administrators
Governor of New South Wales – Sir Roden Cutler
Governor of Queensland – Sir James Ramsay
Governor of South Australia – Sir Keith Seaman
Governor of Tasmania – Sir Stanley Burbury
Governor of Victoria – Sir Henry Winneke
Governor of Western Australia – Sir Wallace Kyle
Administrator of Norfolk Island – Desmond O'Leary (until 4 September), then Peter Coleman
Administrator of the Northern Territory – John England

Events
 Neville Bonner is announced as Australian of the Year

January
4 January — Australia's highest daily rainfall, is recorded at Bellenden Ker Top Station, Queensland.
9 January — Deputy Prime Minister Doug Anthony signs a pact to allow uranium mining to begin at the Ranger Uranium Mine in the Northern Territory. The pact gives the authority to develop the 100,000 tonne deposit to the Australian Atomic Energy Commission, Peko-Wallsend and the Electrolytic Zinc Company for a period of 21 years.

February
9 February – Associated Securities Limited, Australia's fourth-largest finance company, is placed into receivership.  In a statement to the stock exchange, ASL directors state that the results for the six months to 31 December had shown a loss of $2.5 million, plus an extraordinary loss of $1 million from foreign exchange movements.
12 February – Harry M. Miller's Computicket theatre and sporting booking agency collapses.

March
9 March – The Arbitration Commission awards Australian women the right to six weeks' compulsory unpaid maternity leave with the option of extending the leave to one year.  The provisions, which will flow to all awards covering women in the private sector, will take effect on 2 April.

April
4 April – Domico Speranza hijacks a Pan-Am plane at Sydney Airport for 4 1/2 hours until shot dead by police.
11 April – A truck drivers' blockade, which had disrupted the eastern states for 10 days, ends.  The truck drivers had been protesting against state road taxes and low cartage rates.

May
25 May – James William Miller, aged 39, is charged with the murders of four young women (the Truro murders 100 kilometres north-east of Adelaide.  A fifth body has been found and police are searching for two more bodies, bringing the number of victims to a total of seven.  Miller is charged with murdering Veronica Knight, 18, Sylvia Michelle Pittmann, 16, Vicki May Mowell, 26, and Connie Iordanides, 16.

June
8 June – Philip Silleny attempts to hijack a TAA aircraft near Brisbane but is disarmed by hostess Esme Qazim and other crew.
9 June – 
A fire at Luna Park Sydney kills 7. Four young boys, a father and his two young sons die when the fire, believed to be caused by an electrical fault, engulf the ride.  The park is forced to close.
Australia's first modern uranium mine opens at Nabarlek in Arnhem Land.  A$25,000 party is held to celebrate the launch of the mine, which is also the first to open on Aboriginal tribal land.
21 June – Up to a million workers stop work across the country to protest the arrest of unionists in Western Australia for addressing a public meeting without police permission.  Public transport, industry and commercial services are thrown into disarray.
23 June – New South Wales Premier Neville Wran opens the Eastern Suburbs six-station railway line which runs from Sydney city to Bondi Junction.  The railway line has been a source of continuing controversy since work on it began.  In 1976, Neville Wran referred to the project as probably "the most monumental financial scandal" in the state's history.

July
1 July – 
Commonwealth death duties are abolished.
Responsibility for education in the Northern Territory is transferred from the Federal to the Northern Territory Government.
11 July – The American space station Skylab crashes in Esperance, Western Australia.
19 July – The Miss Universe final is celebrated in Perth.
20 July – Inaugural meeting of the National Farmers' Federation
24 July – 14 coal miners die in a lethal gas explosion at Appin Colliery, New South Wales.

August
29 August – Sydney's new heliport at Darling Harbour is officially opened.
30 August – Six die when a Cessna 206 plane crashes at Shepparton, Victoria.

September
22 September – The standing conference of Canonical Orthodox churches in Australia is established.
26 September – New South Wales Attorney-General Frank Walker tables the 960-page Finnane Report in State Parliament.  The New South Wales Government gags Opposition calls for a debate report only 30 minutes after it is tabled.
27 September – 
Australia announces the abolition of traditional trade preferences with Britain.
Ian Sinclair resigns as Federal Primary Industry Minister following allegations that he forged his father's signature on his family's annual returns.  According to the Finnane Report tabled in State Parliament, Ian Sinclair was dishonest in arranging loans from a group of companies of which he was "de facto managing director" to the family pastoral company.  Mr. Sinclair had denied the allegations the day before.

October
7 October – The Australia Refugee Advisory Council is established.
14 October – Australian Council of Trade Unions (ACTU) President Bob Hawke wins preselection for the safe ALP federal seat of Wills, making way for him to enter federal politics next year.  Mr. Hawke defeated the Socialist Left candidate Gerry Hand winning 38 votes from the 70-member selection panel.
19 October – The Australian Federal Police is established under the command of Colin Woods.
20 October – Prime Minister Malcolm Fraser proclaims the first section of the Great Barrier Reef (the Capricornia section) a national park, making it the third Australian national park to be declared this year.  Malcolm Fraser also announces the allocation of $300,000 to research projects to be set up in the region to increase the Federal Government's knowledge of this area.

November
5 November – The first New South Wales Lotto draw takes place.  No-one chose the six winning numbers in the draw, so only half of the first prize – $193,576 – will be divided among the five members of the in the Money syndicate.
6 November – The Royal Commission into Drug Trafficking (Woodward Royal Commission) reports to the New South Wales Parliament, recommending increased penalties and no concessions for soft drugs.
30 November – The Australian Council of Trade Unions (ACTU), at a meeting of 24 major unions, rejects proposals to block the mining export of uranium.

December
16 December – Sunday trading in Sydney public bars begins.

Arts and literature
 Wes Walters wins the Archibald Prize for his portrait of Philip Adams
 David Ireland's novel A Woman of the Future wins the Miles Franklin Award

Film
 My Brilliant Career, directed by Gillian Armstrong, is released
 Mad Max

Television
 11 February – The Australian 60 Minutes begins on the Nine Network
 27 February – Prisoner makes its debut on the 0–10 Network.

Sport
14 January – Tasmania beats Western Australia by 47 runs to win their first Gillette Cup title.
25 March – Australia is represented by nine long-distance runners (all men), including Robert de Castella, at the seventh IAAF World Cross Country Championships in Limerick, Ireland. Steve Austin is Australia's best finisher, claiming the 29th spot (38:36.0) in the race over 12 kilometres.
28 April – Collingwood beat a sixty-year-old record for the greatest VFL winning margin when they demoralise St Kilda by 178 points, beating South Melbourne's 171-point margin also against St Kilda, from 1919.
28 July – Fitzroy set a still-standing record winning margin when they beat Melbourne by 190 points at VFL Park. Their score of 36.22 (238) was a record until 1992.
12 August – Robert de Castella wins the men's national marathon title, clocking 2:13:23 in Perth.
22 September: The 1979 NSWRFL season culminates in minor premiers St. George's 17–13 victory over Canterbury-Bankstown in the Grand Final. North Sydney finish in last position, claiming the wooden spoon.
29 September Carlton Football Club wins the 1979 VFL Grand Final over Collingwood.
6 November – Hyperno wins the Melbourne Cup
 Victoria wins the Sheffield Shield
 Bumblebee IV takes line honours in the Sydney to Hobart Yacht Race. Screw Loose is the handicap winner
 England defeats Australia 5–1 in The Ashes
 Australia wins the Admiral's Cup
 Jack Newton wins the Australian Open golf championship
 The National Basketball League is founded

Births

 2 January – Robert Newbery, diver
 3 January – Brooke Morrison, field hockey striker
 6 January – Adrian Rainey, rugby league player
15 February – James Harvey, basketball player
 4 March – Geoff Huegill, swimmer
 12 March – Jamie Dwyer, field hockey forward
 16 March – Suzie Faulkner, field hockey striker
 4 April
Heath Ledger, actor (died 2008)
Rebecca Stoyel, gymnast
 9 April – Graeme Brown, cyclist
 18 April – Zain Wright, field hockey midfielder
 22 April – Daniel Johns, musician
 4 June – Jade MacRae, singer
 5 June – Matthew Scarlett, footballer and coach
 11 June – Amy Duggan, Australian footballer and journalist
 7 July – Loudy Tourky, diver
 10 July – Russell Hinder, basketball player
 3 August – Nathan Crosswell, basketball player
 9 August – Michael Kingma, basketball player
 14 August – Paul Burgess, pole vaulter
 16 August
 Ian Moran, cricketer
 Adam Darragh, basketball player
 23 August – Lance Whitnall, Australian Rules footballer
 12 September – Aaron Hopkins, field hockey defender
 17 September – Chris Minns, politician
 20 September – Damien Ryan, basketball player
 29 September – Nathan Foley, singer (Hi 5)
 11 October – Ryan Harris, cricketer
 20 October – Tim Neesham, water polo player
 24 October – Matthew Hadgraft, cabaret artist
 6 November – Peter Ceawford, basketball player
 12 November 
 Chad Cornes, footballer
 Matt Stevic, footballer and umpire
 16 November – Salli Wills, gymnast
 15 December – Sam Cawthorn, motivational speaker, author & entrepreneur
 21 December – Stephen Lambert, field hockey goalkeeper

Deaths
 7 January – Ivan Stedman, Olympic swimmer (b. 1895)
 15 April – Sir David Brand, 19th Premier of Western Australia (b. 1912)
 16 April – Frank Stewart, New South Wales politician and rugby league footballer (b. 1923)
 21 May – Walter Skelton, New South Wales politician (b. 1883)
 4 June – Elena Domenica Rubeo, Australian community worker and businessperson (b. 1896)
 6 June – Ion Idriess, author (b. 1889)
 30 June – Jim Southee, New South Wales politician (b. 1902)
 1 September – Mick Cronin, Australian rules footballer and television commentator (b. 1911)
 21 December – Eric Joseph Wright, medical administrator and public servant (b. 1912)

See also
 1979 in Australian television
 List of Australian films of 1979

References

 
Australia
Years of the 20th century in Australia